Ramesh Diwakar (1964/1965 – April 22, 2021) was an Indian politician and Member of the Uttar Pradesh Legislative Assembly for Auraiya from 2017 till his death in 2021. Diwakar died from COVID-19 aged 56.

References

1960s births
2021 deaths
Uttar Pradesh MLAs 2017–2022
Deaths from the COVID-19 pandemic in India
Bharatiya Janata Party politicians from Uttar Pradesh
People from Auraiya district